Henrique Vicêncio (born 8 February 1959) is a Portuguese former swimmer. He competed in three events at the 1976 Summer Olympics.

References

1959 births
Living people
Portuguese male swimmers
Olympic swimmers of Portugal
Swimmers at the 1976 Summer Olympics
Place of birth missing (living people)